The following lists the top 100 singles of 1995  in Australia from the Australian Recording Industry Association (ARIA) End of Year Singles Chart.

Peak chart positions from 1995 are from the ARIA Charts, overall position on the End of Year Chart is calculated by ARIA based on the number of weeks and position that the song reached within the Top 50 singles for each week during 1995.

Notes

References 

Australian record charts
1995 in Australian music
1995 record charts